Daouda Badarou (born 1929) is a Beninese politician. He was the foreign minister of Benin from 1968 to 1969 and again from 1970 to 1971.

References

1929 births
Living people
Foreign ministers of Benin
20th-century Beninese politicians